This page covers all the important events in the sport of tennis in 2005. Primarily, it provides the results of notable tournaments throughout the year on both the ATP and WTA Tours, the Davis Cup, and the Fed Cup.

ITF

Grand Slam events

Australian Open (link)
Men's Doubles:  Wayne Black &  Kevin Ullyett d.  Bob Bryan &  Mike Bryan, 6-4, 6-4.
Women's Doubles:  Svetlana Kuznetsova &  Alicia Molik d.  Lindsay Davenport &  Corina Morariu, 6-3, 6-4.
Mixed Doubles:  Samantha Stosur &  Scott Draper d.  Liezel Huber &  Kevin Ullyett, 6-2, 2-6, 7-6(10-6).
French Open (link)
Men's Doubles:  Jonas Björkman &  Max Mirnyi d.  Bob Bryan &  Mike Bryan, 2-6, 6-1, 6-4.
Women's Doubles:  Virginia Ruano Pascual &  Paola Suárez d.  Cara Black &  Liezel Huber, 4-6, 6-3, 6-3.
Mixed Doubles:  Daniela Hantuchová &  Fabrice Santoro d.  Martina Navratilova &  Leander Paes, 3-6, 6-3, 6-2.
Wimbledon (link)
Men's Doubles:  Stephen Huss &  Wesley Moodie d.  Bob Bryan &  Mike Bryan, 7-6(7-4), 6-3, 6-7(2-7), 6-3.
Women's Doubles:  Cara Black &  Liezel Huber d.  Svetlana Kuznetsova &  Amélie Mauresmo, 6-2, 6-1.
Mixed Doubles:  Mary Pierce &  Mahesh Bhupathi d.  Tatiana Perebiynis &  Paul Hanley, 6-4, 6-2.
U.S. Open (link)
Men's Doubles:  Bob Bryan &  Mike Bryan d.  Jonas Björkman &  Max Mirnyi, 6-1, 6-4.
Women's Doubles:  Lisa Raymond &  Samantha Stosur d.  Elena Dementieva &  Flavia Pennetta, 6-2, 5-7, 6-3.
Mixed Doubles:  Daniela Hantuchová† &  Mahesh Bhupathi d.  Katarina Srebotnik &  Nenad Zimonjić, 6-4, 6-2.

† By winning the U.S. Open mixed doubles title, Hantuchová completed her mixed doubles career grand slam.

Davis Cup

Fed Cup

Hopman Cup

ATP
2005 ATP calendar

Tennis Masters Cup
Shanghai, China
Week of November 14, 2005
Singles:  David Nalbandian defeats  Roger Federer, 6-7(4-7), 6-7(9-11), 6-2, 6-1, 7-6(7-3).
Doubles:  Michaël Llodra &  Fabrice Santoro defeat  Leander Paes &  Nenad Zimonjić, 6-7(6-8), 6-3, 7-6(7-4).

ATP Masters Series

ARAG ATP World Team Championship
Final:  Germany defeats  Argentina, 2-1.
Team Germany: Tommy Haas, Florian Mayer & Alexander Waske
Team Argentina: Guillermo Cañas, Juan Ignacio Chela, Guillermo Coria & Gastón Gaudio

Year-End Top 10

Singles - Entry Ranking
Full List

Singles - Indesit ATP Race

† Highest number of Race points (since 2000).

WTA
2005 WTA calendar

WTA Tour Championships
Los Angeles, USA
Week of November 7, 2005
Singles:  Amélie Mauresmo d.  Mary Pierce, 5–7, 7–6(7–3), 6–4.
Doubles:  Lisa Raymond &  Samantha Stosur d.  Cara Black &  Rennae Stubbs, 6–7(5–7), 7–5, 6–4.

WTA Tier I
Toray Pan Pacific Open, Tokyo, Japan 
Singles:  Maria Sharapova defeated  Lindsay Davenport, 6–1, 3–6, 7–6(7–5).
Doubles:  Janette Husárová &  Elena Likhovtseva defeated  Lindsay Davenport &  Corina Morariu, 6–4, 6–3.
Pacific Life Open, Indian Wells, United States 
Singles:  Kim Clijsters defeated  Lindsay Davenport, 6–4, 4–6, 6–2.
Doubles:  Virginia Ruano Pascual &  Paola Suárez defeated  Nadia Petrova &  Meghann Shaughnessy, 7–6(7–3), 6–1.
NASDAQ-100 Open, Miami, United States 
Singles:  Kim Clijsters defeated  Maria Sharapova, 6–3, 7–5.
Doubles:  Svetlana Kuznetsova &  Alicia Molik defeated  Lisa Raymond &  Rennae Stubbs, 7–5, 6–7(5–7), 6–2.
Family Circle Cup, Charleston, United States
Singles:  Justine Henin-Hardenne defeated  Elena Dementieva, 7–5, 6–4.
Doubles:  Conchita Martínez &  Virginia Ruano Pascual defeated  Iveta Benešová &  Květa Peschke, 6–1, 6–4.
Qatar Total German Open, Berlin, Germany 
Singles:  Justine Henin-Hardenne defeated  Nadia Petrova, 6–3, 4–6, 6–3.
Doubles:  Elena Likhovtseva &  Vera Zvonareva defeated  Cara Black &  Liezel Huber, 4–6, 6–4, 6–3.
Telecom Italia Masters Roma, Rome, Italy
Singles:  Amélie Mauresmo defeated  Patty Schnyder, 2–6, 6–3, 6–4.
Doubles:  Cara Black &  Liezel Huber defeated  Maria Kirilenko &  Anabel Medina Garrigues, 6–0, 4–6, 6–1.
Acura Classic, San Diego, United States
Singles:  Mary Pierce defeated  Ai Sugiyama, 6–0, 6–3.
Doubles:  Conchita Martínez &  Virginia Ruano Pascual defeated  Daniela Hantuchová &  Ai Sugiyama, 6–7(7–9), 6–1, 7–5.
Rogers Cup presented by American Express, Toronto, Canada
Singles:  Kim Clijsters defeated  Justine Henin-Hardenne, 7–5, 6–1.
Doubles:  Anna-Lena Grönefeld &  Martina Navratilova defeated  Conchita Martínez &  Virginia Ruano Pascual, 5–7, 6–3, 6–4.
Kremlin Cup, Moscow, Russia
Singles:  Mary Pierce defeated  Francesca Schiavone, 6–4, 6–3.
Doubles:  Lisa Raymond &  Samantha Stosur defeated  Cara Black &  Rennae Stubbs, 6–2, 6–4.
Zurich Open, Zürich, Switzerland
Singles:  Lindsay Davenport defeated  Patty Schnyder, 7–6(7–5), 6–3.
Doubles:  Cara Black &  Rennae Stubbs defeated  Daniela Hantuchová &  Ai Sugiyama, 6–7(6–8), 7–6(7–4), 6–3.

Singles - Entry Ranking
Full List

International Tennis Hall of Fame
Class of 2005:
Jim Courier, player
Yannick Noah, player
Jana Novotná, player
Butch Buchholz, contributor

References

 
Tennis by year